Anastassiya Krestova (born 31 January 1996) is a Kazakhstani short track speed skater. She competed in the women's 500 metres at the 2018 Winter Olympics.

References

1996 births
Living people
Kazakhstani female short track speed skaters
Olympic short track speed skaters of Kazakhstan
Short track speed skaters at the 2018 Winter Olympics
Asian Games bronze medalists for Kazakhstan
Asian Games medalists in short track speed skating
Short track speed skaters at the 2017 Asian Winter Games
Medalists at the 2017 Asian Winter Games
Place of birth missing (living people)
Universiade bronze medalists for Kazakhstan
Universiade medalists in short track speed skating
Competitors at the 2017 Winter Universiade
21st-century Kazakhstani women